The channelosome (not to be confused with "channelome") is the collection of (usually) signalling proteins associated with an ion channel.  The channelosome is frequently clustered within a lipid microdomain or  caveolae.  This collection of proteins may be involved with anchoring, phosphorylation or some other modulatory or support function.  An example is neural KCNQ/M (Kv7) potassium channelosome (see Delmas & Brown, 2005).

References 

Cell communication
Electrophysiology
Neurochemistry